Sergio Armando Villanueva Reyes (born 19 August 1991) is a Mexican professional boxer who held the WBC Youth featherweight title from 2011 to 2012.

Professional career
In December 2010, Sergio beat the veteran Erick Perez, the bout was held at the Estadio Beto Ávila, in Veracruz, Veracruz, Mexico.

On 18 June 2011 Villanueva defeated Colombia's Onalvi Sierra. The bout was for the vacant WBC Youth featherweight title and was held on the undercard of Saúl Álvarez vs. Ryan Rhodes.

References

External links

Boxers from Jalisco
Sportspeople from Guadalajara, Jalisco
Featherweight boxers
1988 births
Living people
Mexican male boxers